Zdrójno   is a village in the administrative district of Gmina Bierzwnik, within Choszczno County, West Pomeranian Voivodeship, in north-western Poland. 

References

Villages in Choszczno County